The 1965 Atlantic hurricane season was the first to use the modern-day bounds for an Atlantic hurricane season, which are June 1 to November 30. These dates conventionally delimit the period of each year when most tropical cyclones form in the Atlantic basin. It was a slightly below average season, with 10 tropical cyclones developing and reaching tropical storm intensity. Four of the storms strengthened into hurricanes. One system reached major hurricane intensity – Category 3 or higher on the Saffir–Simpson hurricane scale. The first system, an unnamed tropical storm, developed during the month of June in the southern Gulf of Mexico. The storm moved northward across Central America, but caused no known impact in the region. It struck the Florida Panhandle and caused minor impact across much of the Southern United States. Tropical cyclogenesis halted for over two months, until Anna formed on August 21. The storm remained well away from land in the far North Atlantic Ocean and caused no impact.

Hurricane Betsy was the strongest and most devastating storm of the season. Extensive damage from Betsy was reported in the Bahamas, Florida, and Louisiana, particularly the New Orleans area. It was the first hurricane in the history of the United States to result in at least $1 billion (1965 USD) in losses. Hurricane Carol meandered in the eastern Atlantic for over two weeks from mid-September to very early October. Impact on land from Carol was minimal. In late September, Tropical Storm Debbie developed in the northwestern Caribbean and moved slowly across the region, before later reaching the Gulf of Mexico. The storm dissipated just offshore of Louisiana, which resulted in only minor impact along the Gulf Coast of the United States. The final tropical cyclone, Hurricane Elena, formed on October 12. Elena remained at sea for nearly a week and caused no damage on land. Collectively, the storms of the 1965 Atlantic hurricane season caused 76 fatalities and $1.68 billion in damage, almost entirely due to Hurricane Betsy.

Season summary 

This was the first Atlantic hurricane season to start on June 1 and end on November 30, which is the modern-day season bounds. A total of 13 tropical depressions formed. Ten of those tropical depression intensified into a tropical storm, which was just slightly below the National Oceanic and Atmospheric Administration's 1950–2005 average of 11. Four of those tropical storms attained hurricane status, slightly below the average of six. One hurricane intensified into a major hurricane, which is Category 3 or greater on the Saffir–Simpson scale. This was slightly below the average of two per season. Overall, the tropical cyclones of this season collectively caused about $1.68 billion in damage and 76 deaths.

Season activity began with the development of a tropical depression in the Gulf of Mexico on June 11. This was quickly followed by the formation of an unnamed tropical storm over the southern Gulf of Mexico two days later. However, the season briefly became dormant after the storm became extratropical on June 15, and there were no other tropical cyclones in June or July. The next system, a tropical depression, formed on August 8, about one and a half months later. The remainder of August featured hurricanes Anna and Betsy.

While Betsy would mostly exist in September, the month also featured four additional tropical cyclones – an unnamed tropical storm, Hurricane Carol, a tropical depression, and then Debbie. In October, three tropical systems formed, including two unnamed tropical storms and Hurricane Elena. The final tropical cyclone of the 1965 season, an unnamed tropical storm, developed from a previously non-tropical cyclone northeast of the Lesser Antilles on November 29. The storm persisted into the month of December, before dissipating on December 2.

The season's activity was reflected with an accumulated cyclone energy (ACE) rating of 88, which was below the 1950–2005 average of 93.2. ACE is, broadly speaking, a measure of the power of the hurricane multiplied by the length of time it existed, so storms that last a long time, as well as particularly strong hurricanes, have high ACEs. It is only calculated for full advisories on tropical cyclones with winds exceeding , which is tropical storm strength.

Systems

June tropical depression 
A trough of low pressure reached the central Gulf of Mexico by June 10. The trough spawned a low-pressure area, which became a tropical depression on June 11. The depression moved northwestward and struck Mississippi before dissipating on the following day.

Tropical Storm One 

A cut-off low-pressure area developed from a shear trough in the northwestern Gulf of Mexico on June 9. The low caused the detachment of a disturbance from the Intertropical convergence zone, which was located near the south coast of Guatemala. After moving across Guatemala and Mexico, the low emerged into the Gulf of Mexico on June 13. The low intensified on the following day, reaching tropical storm status at 0600 UTC. It likely was a subtropical storm, however, the lack of consistent satellite data precludes such a classification. Operationally, the system was considered a tropical depression for its entire duration, thus, this went unnamed.

At 1100 UTC on June 15, the storm made landfall near Santa Rosa Beach, Florida, at the same intensity. Inland, the storm continued northeastward and became extratropical over South Carolina at 0000 UTC on June 16. Winds blew the roof off of two beach cottages on St. George Island, while tides sank or washed ashore several small boats. Slick roads in Tallahassee resulted in several car accidents, but no injuries occurred. The rains also left street flooding in the Inglewood neighborhood of Tallahassee, forcing the evacuation of two families. Two tornadoes were spawned in Florida, with one damaging houses and a mobile home in Live Oak. The storm also brought rainfall to several other states.

August tropical depression 
A tropical wave approached the Leeward Islands on August 6. The depression emerged into the eastern Caribbean and then quickly dissipated.

Hurricane Anna 

A weak circulation was noted by Television Infrared Observation Satellite (TIROS) near Cape Verde on August 16. During the next five days, the system tracked west-northwestward or northwestward, while conditions gradually became favorable for tropical cyclogenesis. At 0600 UTC on August 21, it is estimated that the system became Tropical Storm Anna. While Anna was tracking north-northeastward on August 23, an eye feature appeared on TIROS. After another aircraft reported an eye on its radar, Anna was upgraded to a hurricane later that day. Early on August 24, Anna reached maximum sustained winds of  while accelerating northeastward. Anna began losing tropical characteristics, and early on the following day, it transitioned into an extratropical storm while about halfway between the Azores and Greenland.

Hurricane Betsy 

A tropical disturbance developed into a tropical depression on August 27, while well east of the Windward Islands. It tracked generally west-northward until crossing the Leeward Islands on August 28. Early the next day, the depression intensified into Tropical Storm Betsy, shortly before striking Saint Martin and Anguilla. Betsy continued to intensify after re-emerging into the western Atlantic, becoming a hurricane on September 1. After executing a brief cyclonic loop, the storm then turned to the west. However, the storm fell back to Category 3 intensity early the next day. By September 5, Betsy executed another cyclonic loop northeast of the Bahamas and fell to as low as Category 1 intensity around 0000 UTC on September 6. The storm fluctuated between Category 2 and 3 as it headed southwestward and then westward over the next day, passing over or close to several Bahamian islands, including Great Abaco and Andros. Betsy caused one fatality and approximately $14 million in damage in the island chain, mostly to agriculture and crops.

By early on September 8, Betsy made landfall near Tavernier, Florida, as a Category 3 hurricane. In South Florida, the storm brought strong winds and significant storm surge. Water reached several feet in height in upper Florida Keys, inundating highways and the first floor of buildings. Nearly all of the land south of Homestead Air Force Base and east of U.S. Route 1 was covered by water. There were 8 deaths and $120 million in losses, which included both property and agriculture. However, further intensification was halted after Betsy made landfall in Grand Isle, Louisiana, around 0400 UTC. In Louisiana, strong winds and rough seas caused extensive damage. Storm surge inundated the levees in New Orleans, flooding much of the city. Throughout the state, more than 22,000 homes were either damaged or destroyed, and 168,000 people were left without electricity. The storm caused more than 17,000 injuries and resulted in 58 deaths. Damage in the state of Louisiana reached $1.2 billion. Once inland, the storm turned northeastward and rapidly weakened, becoming extratropical over Tennessee on September 11. Impact in other states ranged from minor to moderate. Overall, Betsy caused about $1.43 billion in damage and 76 fatalities. Betsy was the first hurricane in the United States to cause at least $1 billion in damage.

Tropical Storm Four 

A cold front moved eastward from North America into the western Atlantic Ocean on August 28. An extratropical low developed on August 31 over the north Atlantic, which degenerated into a trough three days later. On September 4, another extratropical storm developed, located about 800 mi (1,285 km) south of Newfoundland. The system attained gale-force winds a day later, and turned westward on September 6, steered by a building ridge to the north. On September 7, the storm transitioned into a tropical storm, after its wind field became more symmetrical. The storm turned to the east and northeast, crossing over its former path. On September 10, the tropical storm again transitioned into an extratropical storm, which later passed southeast of Newfoundland. The storm moved across the northern Atlantic Ocean, dissipating on September 13 southwest of Ireland.

Hurricane Carol 

A tropical wave emerged into the Atlantic from the west coast of Africa on September 15, and developed into a tropical depression by early on the following day. It headed steadily westward and strengthened into Tropical Storm Carol late on September 17. The storm began curving northwestward by the following day. Operationally, advisories were not initiated until 1900 UTC on September 19, after winds had already reached . Carol then slowed and began turning north-northward. Later on September 20, a Navy reconnaissance flight confirmed a circulation and also measured hurricane-force winds. Thus, Carol was upgraded to a hurricane at 1800 UTC on September 20.

The hurricane accelerated, before slowing in forward motion on September 22. Between September 24 and September 28, the storm drifted and executed a small cyclonic loop and fluctuating from tropical storm status to Category 1 intensity and back to tropical storm strengthen during that time. After turning northeastward, Carol re-intensified into a hurricane on September 25. The storm curved east-southeastward, weakened, and transitioned into an extratropical cyclone while located north of the Azores on September 30. The remnants of Carol turned southeastward and then southward before dissipating near the Canary Islands on October 3.

Tropical Storm Debbie 

A low-pressure area in the northwestern Caribbean Sea developed into a tropical depression on September 24. The depression brought locally heavy rainfall to areas of Honduras while tracking northwestward. Despite winds of only , the Miami Weather Bureau prematurely named the depression Debbie at 1600 UTC on September 25. Several hours later, Debbie struck the northeastern Yucatán Peninsula. After emerging into the Gulf of Mexico early on September 26, the storm was described as "weaker than before", as the convective activity indicated no organization. However, Debbie began to strengthen, reaching tropical storm status late on September 27.

After peaked at winds of  late on September 28, cooler and drier air caused the storm to weaken. The storm quickly weakened to a tropical depression and dissipated by early the next day. Despite weakening significantly before landfall, Debbie brought heavy precipitation, especially in Mobile, Alabama, where a 24-hour rainfall record was broken after  fell. Within the city of Mobile, hundreds of cars were flooded, while more than 200 people fled their inundated homes. Many roads and businesses were also closed in the area. Damage in Mobile alone reached $25 million. Rainfall was reported in seven other states, though no significant impact occurred.

Tropical Storm Seven 

On September 25, a cold front emerged into the western Atlantic Ocean and stalled. An extratropical storm developed along the front on September 29 to the southeast of the Carolinas. The storm moved quickly east-northeastward and quickly intensified to near hurricane intensity. On September 30, the storm passed north of Bermuda, producing winds of  there. On October 1, the system reversed its track, weakened slightly, and became more symmetric. By October 2, the strongest winds were located near the circulation center, based on nearby ship reports. Based on the observations, the Atlantic hurricane reanalysis project estimated that the system transitioned into a tropical storm on this day, although the storm could have been a subtropical cyclone. The storm moved to the north and northeast ahead of a cold front. On October 3, the front absorbed the storm.

Hurricane Elena 

TIROS imagery indicated a very weak circulation near 12°N, 40°W on October 11. Ship reports on the following day indicated a somewhat more organized circulation. As a result, it is estimated that the final tropical depression of the season at 1200 UTC on October 12, while located about midway between Cape Verde and the Leeward Islands. Initially, the depression remained disorganized while tracking northwestward. However, by early on October 14, the depression strengthened into Tropical Storm Elena. The storm continued to intensify as it headed northwestward, before turning to the northeast late on October 16. Elena became a Category 1 hurricane at 1200 UTC on October 17 and then reached Category 2 status early the next day. At 0600 UTC on October 19, the storm merged with an approaching cold front near the Azores. The remnants moved rapidly north-northeastward until dissipating near Iceland on October 20.

Tropical Storm Nine 

A trough persisted along the southeastern United States on October 15. A day later, a tropical depression formed along the trough near the northwestern Bahamas. The system quickly intensified into a tropical storm; due to its large circulation, the storm was potentially a subtropical cyclone. The storm moved in a counterclockwise direction – southeast at first, and eventually curving to the west-southwest. At 15:00 UTC that day, the storm made landfall at peak intensity near Flagler Beach, Florida. It quickly weakened while crossing the state, and dissipated the next day in the eastern Gulf of Mexico. The storm, in conjunction with a high-pressure system over New England, produced gale-force winds in the Carolinas.

The precursor trough associated with this cyclone dropped heavy rainfall over the Miami metropolitan area. The Bahia Mar marina in Fort Lauderdale recorded  of precipitation, while at least  of rain fell in a roughly triangular-shaped area bounded by Loxahatchee, West Palm Beach, and Hollywood. Floodwaters inundated and damaged many roads throughout southeast Florida. An estimated 75% of crops in eastern Palm Beach County were lost, equivalent to approximately $4.5 million in damage. After the system became a tropical storm and approached the coast of Florida, storm gale warnings were issued from Cape Kennedy, Florida, to Cape Hatteras, North Carolina. The storm caused several power outages in the Jacksonville area but left little damage.

Tropical Storm Ten 

A cold front exited the east coast of the United States on November 22, and moved eastward. An extratropical storm developed along the front on November 26, located northeast of the Lesser Antilles. The storm moved northeastward, executed a small loop, and strengthened slightly. Gradually, the storm's structure became more symmetrical, and by November 29, the system transitioned into a tropical storm. On December 1, the storm weakened into a tropical depression, and on the same day, the track shifted to the west. On December 2, the depression dissipated.

Other systems
On September 21, an extratropical low-pressure area developed at the tail-end of a cold front over the west-central Atlantic. The low gradually lost frontal characteristics and acquired a more symmetrical structure, becoming a tropical depression just north of Bermuda on September 24. Curving northeastward, the depression transitioned into an extratropical cyclone on September 26 and a different cold front absorbed it by the next day.

Storm names 
The following names were used for named storms (tropical storms and hurricanes) that formed in the North Atlantic in 1965.

Retirement 

The name Betsy was later retired. Carol had been removed from the naming list for 10 years following Hurricane Carol of 1954. It was then retroactively retired because of the 1954 hurricane, not the storm in 1965. They were replaced with Blanche and Camille for use in the 1969 season.

Season effects 
The following table lists all of the storms that have formed in the 1965 Atlantic hurricane season. It includes their duration, names, landfall(s) (in parentheses), damages, and death totals. Deaths in parentheses are additional and indirect (an example of an indirect death would be a traffic accident), but were still related to that storm. Damage and deaths include totals while the storm was extratropical, a wave, or a low, and all of the damage figures are in 1965 USD.

See also 

 Atlantic hurricane season
 List of Atlantic hurricanes
 1965 Pacific hurricane season
 1965 Pacific typhoon season
 Australian cyclone seasons: 1964–65, 1965–66
 South Pacific cyclone seasons: 1964–65, 1965–66
 South-West Indian Ocean cyclone seasons: 1964–65, 1965–66

References

External links 
 Monthly Weather Review

 
Articles which contain graphical timelines